The Tromper Wiek is a bay on the Baltic Sea between the peninsulas of Wittow and Jasmund on the island of Rügen in northeast Germany.

This bay (locally: Wiek) runs in a wide arc from Cape Arkona in the north, through the villages of Juliusruh and Glowe either side of the River Schaabe to the start of the chalk cliffs of the Stubnitz near Lohme.

The bay is named after the Dutch admiral, Cornelis Tromp, who, in the second half of the 17th century, led numerous sea battles in the service of Denmark and Brandenburg. For example, he was the commander of the Brandenburg fleet, that landed near Neukamp near Putbus on 23 September 1678 – supported by Denmark – in order to drive the Swedes from the island of Rügen for a short period.

On 8 August 1715, during the Great Northern War (1700–1721), the Danish fleet threw a Swedish supply flotilla out of the Tromper Wiek sending them back to Bornholm. The Swedish king, Charles XII is supposed to have watched this sea battle from Königsstuhl on Rügen, hence the name (which means "King's Chair").

References

Literature 
 Harald Krause: Wiek und Wikinger – Entstehung und Entwicklung der Schifffahrt und maritimer Begriffe der Seefahrer im erweiterten Ostseeraum. In: Stier und Greif. Blätter zur Kultur- und Landesgeschichte in Mecklenburg-Vorpommern. Jahrg. 19, Schwerin 2009, pp. 10–21

Bays of Mecklenburg-Western Pomerania
Bays of the Baltic Sea
Geography of Rügen